Sainte-Brigide-d'Iberville is a municipality in the province of Quebec, Canada, located in the Regional County Municipality of Le Haut-Richelieu. The population as of the Canada 2011 Census was 1,331.

Demographics

Population

Language

See also
List of municipalities in Quebec

References

Municipalities in Quebec
Incorporated places in Le Haut-Richelieu Regional County Municipality